Leh was a constituency in the Jammu and Kashmir Legislative Assembly of Jammu and Kashmir a north state of India. Leh is also part of Ladakh Lok Sabha constituency.

Member of Legislative Assembly

 1962: Kushak Bakula, Jammu & Kashmir National Conference
 1967: Sonam Wangyal, Indian National Congress
 1972: Sonam Wangyal, Indian National Congress
 1977: Sonam Narboo, Indian National Congress
 1980 (By-elections): S.Angdoo, Independent
 1983: Sonam Gyalsan, Indian National Congress
 1987: Tsering Samphel, Indian National Congress
 1996: Chering Dorjay, Indian National Congress
 2002: Nawang Rigzin Jora, Independent
 2008: Nawang Rigzin Jora, Indian National Congress
 2014: Nawang Rigzin Jora, Indian National Congress

Election results

2014

See also

 Leh
 Leh district
 List of constituencies of Jammu and Kashmir Legislative Assembly

References

Leh district
Leh
Government of Ladakh
Former assembly constituencies of Jammu and Kashmir